Read My Lips is the 1989 debut solo album by Jimmy Somerville, former lead singer of the successful synthpop groups Bronski Beat and The Communards. The album was released through London Records and peaked at number 29 on the UK Albums Chart. It has been certified Gold by the British Phonographic Industry for sales in excess of 100,000 copies.

In July 2012, Read My Lips was released as a two disc CD set including the original album plus bonus tracks of B-sides and remixes.

Track listing

Original 1989 album
LP

All LP tracks by Jimmy Somerville unless otherwise indicated

"Comment te dire adieu" featuring June Miles-Kingston (Jack Gold, Arnold Goland, Serge Gainsbourg) - 3:37 	
"You Make Me Feel (Mighty Real)" (Dip Warrick, Sylvester James) - 5:22 	
"Perfect Day" - 4:08 	
"Heaven Here On Earth (With Your Love)" - 5:02 	
"Don't Know What to Do (Without You)" - 6:10 
"Read My Lips (Enough Is Enough)" - 4:59 	
"My Heart Is in Your Hands" - 4:33 	
"Control" - 4:36 	
"And You Never Thought That This Could Happen to You" - 4:58 	
"Rain" - 5:49

CD
"Comment te dire adieu" (featuring June Miles-Kingston) - 3:39 	
"You Make Me Feel (Mighty Real)" - 5:14 	
"Perfect Day" - 4:09 	
"Heaven Here On Earth (With Your Love)" - 5:04 	
"Don't Know What to Do (Without You)" - 6:12 
"Adieu !" (Madame Tata Mix) - 7:31
"Read My Lips (Enough Is Enough)" - 5:00 	
"My Heart Is In Your Hands" - 4:24	
"Control" - 4:37 	
"And You Never Thought That This Could Happen to You" - 5:00 	
"Rain" - 5:48

2012 2-CD reissue
CD 1
"Comment te dire adieu" (featuring June Miles-Kingston)
"You Make Me Feel (Mighty Real)"
"Perfect Day"
"Heaven Here On Earth (With Your Love)"
"Don’t Know What to Do (Without You)"
"Comment te dire adieu" [June et Jim présentent Madame Tata Mix]
"Read My Lips (Enough Is Enough)"
"My Heart Is In Your Hands"
"Control"
"And You Never Thought This Could Happen to You"
"Rain"
"Run From Love"
"To Love Somebody" [The Definitive Mix]
"Comment te dire adieu" [Kevin Saunderson Mix] (Part 1)
"Smalltown Boy" [1991 remix]

CD 2	
"To Love Somebody" [Dub Mix]
"Comment te dire adieu" [Kevin Saunderson Mix] (Part 2)
"Read My Lips" (Enough Is Enough) [JZJ remix]
"Tell the World"
"Not So God Almighty"
"Rain" [Pascal Gabriel] remix]
"To Love Somebody" [instrumental]
"Run From Love" [extended]
"Desire"
"Stranger"
"Why" [Pascal Gabriel remix] Bronski Beat
"Read My Lips" [JZJ remix dub]
"To Love Somebody" [Unplugged live]

Charts
Album

Singles

Certifications

References 

1989 debut albums
Jimmy Somerville albums
Albums produced by Stephen Hague
London Records albums